Yevgeni Igorevich Shlyakov (born 30 August 1991) is a Russian professional footballer who plays for Torpedo Moscow.

Club career
He made his Russian Football National League debut for FC Dynamo Bryansk on 21 April 2010 in a game against FC Mordovia Saransk.

He made his Russian Premier League debut for FC Tambov on 16 March 2020, when he started the game against PFC Krylia Sovetov Samara.

On 17 January 2021, he joined Romanian club FC UTA Arad.

On 15 June 2022, Shlyakov signed with Russian Premier League club Fakel Voronezh. His contract with Fakel was terminated by mutual consent on 1 December 2022.

On 28 December 2022, Shlyakov joined Torpedo Moscow.

Honours
KAMAZ
Russian Football National League 2 – Ural-Povolzhye Zone: 2014–15

Tambov
Russian Football National League: 2018–19

Career statistics

References

External links
 
 
 

1991 births
Sportspeople from Bryansk
Living people
Russian footballers
Russia under-21 international footballers
Association football defenders
FC Dynamo Bryansk players
FC Tyumen players
FC Volgar Astrakhan players
FC KAMAZ Naberezhnye Chelny players
FC Tambov players
FC SKA-Khabarovsk players
FC UTA Arad players
FC Fakel Voronezh players
FC Torpedo Moscow players
Russian First League players
Russian Second League players
Russian Premier League players
Liga I players
Russian expatriate footballers
Russian expatriate sportspeople in Romania
Expatriate footballers in Romania